The Calgary Stampeders are a professional Canadian football team based in Calgary, Alberta, and are members of the West Division in the Canadian Football League (CFL).

The Stampeders were founded in 1935 (as the Calgary Bronks), although the team was inactive from 1941 to 1944.

Key

Head coaches
Note: Statistics are current through the end of the 2022 CFL season.

Notes
 A running total of the number of coaches of the Stampeders. Thus, any coach who has two or more separate terms as head coach is only counted once.
 Each year is linked to an article about that particular CFL season.

References

Lists of Canadian Football League head coaches by team
Calgary Stampeders lists